Petr Sokolov (birth unknown) is a Russian rugby league footballer. He played the majority of his professional career for RC Lokomotiv Moscow in the Championship of Russia competition.

Background
Petr Sokolov was born in Moscow, Russia.

Playing career
Sokolov was selected in the Russian national side at the 2000 World Cup and played in all games for his nation during the competition.

References

External links
2000 World Cup player profile

Living people
Russia national rugby league team players
Russian rugby league players
Sportspeople from Moscow
Year of birth missing (living people)
Rugby articles needing expert attention